Year 1415 (MCDXV) was a common year starting on Tuesday (link will display the full calendar) of the Julian calendar.

Events 
<onlyinclude>

January–December 
 April 30 – Frederick I becomes Elector of Brandenburg.
 June 5 – The Council of Constance condemns the writings of John Wycliffe and asks Jan Hus to recant in public his heresy; after his denial, he is tried for heresy, excommunicated, then sentenced to be burned at the stake.
 July 4 – Pope Gregory XII officially opens the Council of Constance, and then abdicates. He is the last pope to resign, until Pope Benedict XVI in 2013.
 July 6 – Jan Hus is burned at the stake in Konstanz.
 July 31 – Henry V of England is informed of the Southampton Plot against him; he has the leaders arrested and executed, before invading France.
 August 21 – Conquest of Ceuta: Portugal conquers the city of Ceuta from the Moors, initiating the Portuguese Empire, and European expansion and colonialism.
 October 25 – Battle of Agincourt: Archers of Henry V of England are instrumental in defeating a massed army of French knights.

Date unknown 
 Avignon Pope Benedict XIII orders all Talmuds to be delivered to the diocese, and held until further notice.
 The Swiss Confederation takes the territory of Aargau from the house of Habsburg.
 The Grand Canal of China is reinstated by this year after it had fallen out of use; restoration began in 1411, and was a response by the Yongle Emperor of the Ming Dynasty to improve the grain shipment system of tribute traveling from south to north, towards his new capital at Beijing. With this action, the food supply crisis is solved by the end of the year.

Births 
 March 10 – Vasily II of Moscow, Grand Prince (d. 1462)
 March 14 – Wilhelm II, Count of Henneberg-Schleusingen (d. 1444)
 May 3 – Cecily Neville, English duchess, mother of Edward IV of England and Richard III of England (d. 1495)
 September 12 – John Mowbray, 3rd Duke of Norfolk, English magnate (d. 1461)
 September 16 – Elizabeth de Beauchamp, Baroness Bergavenny, English baroness (d. 1448)
 September 21 – Frederick III, Holy Roman Emperor (d. 1493)
 October 18 – Heinrich von Dissen, German theologian (d. 1484)
 November 26 – Han Myung-hoi, Korean politician (d. 1487)
 December 1 – Jan Długosz, Polish historian (d. 1480)
 date unknown
 Benedetto Accolti, Italian jurist and historian (d. 1464)
 Rennyo, Japanese Buddhist leader (d. 1499)
 Chakkaphat Phaen Phaeo, Lan Xang king (d. 1481)

Deaths 
 April 15 – Manuel Chrysoloras, Greek humanist
 July 6 – Jan Hus, Bohemian reformer (burned at the stake) (b. 1369)
 July 19 – Philippa of Lancaster, queen of John I of Portugal (plague) (b. 1359)
 August 2 – Thomas Grey, conspirator against King Henry V (executed) (b. 1384)
 August 5 
 Richard of Conisburgh, 3rd Earl of Cambridge (executed) (b. 1375)
 Henry Scrope, 3rd Baron Scrope of Masham (executed) (b. 1370)
 September 17 – Michael de la Pole, 2nd Earl of Suffolk (killed in battle) (b. 1367)
 October 13 – Thomas FitzAlan, 12th Earl of Arundel, English military leader (b. 1381)
 October 25 (killed in Battle of Agincourt)
 John I of Alençon (b. 1385)
 Charles d'Albret, Count of Dreux and Constable of France
 Antoine, Duke of Brabant (b. 1384)
 Michael de la Pole, 3rd Earl of Suffolk (b. 1394)
 Frederick of Lorraine, Count of Vaudémont (b. 1371)
 Philip II, Count of Nevers (b. 1389)
 Edward of Norwich, 2nd Duke of York (b. 1373)
 Dafydd Gam, Welsh nobleman (b. c. 1380)

References